Peter Madsen (born 1971) is a Danish entrepreneur and convicted murderer.

Peter Madsen may also refer to:

 Mick Madsen (Peter Madsen, 1900–1979), Australian rugby league footballer 
 Peter Madsen (cartoonist) (born 1958), Danish cartoonist
 Peter Madsen (footballer) (born 1978), Danish international footballer
 Peter Madsen (pianist) (born 1955), American jazz pianist